Bjelajce  is a village in the municipality of Mrkonjic Grad, Republika Srpska, Bosnia and Herzegovina.

References

Populated places in Mrkonjić Grad